Christopher Lekapenos or Lecapenus was the eldest son of Emperor Romanos I Lekapenos and co-emperor of the Byzantine Empire from 921 until his death in 931. Romanos, who had made himself emperor in 920, raised Christopher to co-emperor on 21 May 921 in order to give his family precedence over Constantine VII's Macedonian line. In 928 Christopher's father-in-law, Niketas, unsuccessfully attempted to incite Christopher to usurp his father, resulting in Niketas being banished. Christopher died in August 931, succeeded by his father and two brothers, Stephen Lekapenos and Constantine Lekapenos, and Constantine VII. In December 944 his brothers overthrew and exiled their father, but they themselves were exiled after attempting to oust Constantine VII.

Life 

Christopher was the eldest son and the second-oldest child (after his sister Helena) of Romanos Lekapenos and his wife Theodora. His younger siblings were Agatha, who married Romanos Argyros; Stephen and Constantine (co-emperors from 924 until 945); Theophylact (Patriarch of Constantinople in 933–956); and two unnamed younger sisters. Nothing is known of Christopher's early life. He was certainly an adult by 919–920, and had a daughter of marriageable age in 927, hence he was probably born around 890–895.

Romanos succeeded in having his daughter Helena Lekapene married to the 13-year-old emperor Constantine VII Porphyrogennetos in spring 919 and assumed the role of guardian of the emperor with the title . Romanos soon crowned himself emperor in December 920, and eventually advanced himself before the young Constantine in precedence. To further cement his position, and planning to advance his own family over the Macedonian line to which Constantine VII belonged, Romanos crowned Christopher as co-emperor on 20 May 921. When Christopher's mother, Theodora, died on 20 February 922, his wife Sophia was raised to the dignity of  alongside Helena Lekapene. 

In 924, Christopher's younger brothers Stephen and Constantine were crowned as co-emperors. The popular historian John Julius Norwich comments that the two were immoral and corrupt, and summarises them as "worthless". He states that Christopher, in comparison, "showed some degree of promise and might have proved worthy of his father had he lived to succeed him". On 8 October 927, as part of a peace agreement, Christopher's daughter Maria, renamed Irene (meaning "peace") for the occasion, was married to the Bulgarian emperor Peter I. The marriage of a Byzantine princess to a foreign ruler was highly unusual at the time. On the third day of the feast, 10 October, held in Pegae, at the insistence of the Bulgarians, perhaps engineered by Romanos, Christopher was advanced before Constantine Porphyrogennetos, making him first among the rather large group of co-emperors. 

In 928, his father-in-law Niketas unsuccessfully tried to incite Christopher to depose his father, but was banished. The motive behind the attempted coup was perhaps Christopher's poor health, and fears by his wife and her father that, should he die prematurely, they would lose their status. In 929, or later, Christopher served as a best man for the wedding of the Bulgarian prince Ivan, who had fled from Bulgaria to Constantinople after conspiring to seize the Bulgarian throne. Christopher died in August 931. As Romanos' favourite son, he was much mourned by his father, who shed tears "more than the Egyptians" according to Theophanes Continuatus, and thereafter increasingly became devoted to religious pursuits. Soon after Christopher's death, Sophia too retired from the court and entered a monastery, where she died. Christopher's death resulted in the weakening of the alliance between the Byzantine and Bulgarian empires. Irene, the Empress of Bulgaria, ceased making her frequent visits to her homeland in the years following her father's passing, only returning once more.

Christopher was succeeded by his father and his two brothers, Stephen Lekapenos and Constantine Lekapenos, and Constantine VII. In December 944 Stephen and Constantine deposed their father, forcing him to live in a monastery on Prote, in the Princes' Islands, but when they attempted to also depose Constantine VII, the people of Constantinople revolted and overthrew them, resulting in them being likewise exiled. Romanos died in June 948, Stephen on Easter 963, and Constantine sometime between 946 and 948, while trying to escape.

Family 
Through his marriage to Sophia, Christopher had three children:
 Maria-Irene, the Empress-consort of Peter I of Bulgaria.
 Romanos, still a child at the time of Christopher's death. According to the chronicler Zonaras, he was favoured by his grandfather, who considered promoting him to his father's place as senior co-emperor, which ultimately failed due to his death shortly after his father's.
 Michael, an infant at the time of Christopher's death, was made a cleric at the time of the family's fall from power in 945.

References

Sources 

 
 

 
 

Macedonian dynasty
931 deaths
Armenian Byzantine emperors
Christopher
Christopher
Byzantine junior emperors
Year of birth unknown
Burials at Myrelaion Monastery (Constantinople)
Constantine VII
Sons of Byzantine emperors
Sons of emperors
Megaloi hetaireiarchai